Juan Vargas (born 1961) is American politician.

Juan Vargas may also refer to:

Juan Camilo Vargas (born 1994), Colombian squash player
Juan Manuel Vargas (born 1983), football (soccer) player from Peru
Tetelo Vargas (Juan Esteban Vargas, 1906–1971), baseball player from the Dominican Republic
Juan Vargas (judoka), Salvadoran judoka
Juan Vargas (swimmer), from Cuba